Doug Polen (born September 2, 1960) is an American former professional motorcycle road racer. He raced successfully in AMA Superbike, Japanese Superbike Championship, Superbike World Championship and endurance racing. Polen was inducted to the AMA Motorcycle Hall of Fame in 2011.

Motorcycle racing career
Born in Detroit, Michigan, Polen's family moved to Denton, Texas where he began his motorcycle road racing career in 1977 as a privateer racer. Injuries sustained in a crash in mid-1982 made Polen decide to quit racing but, friends convinced him to begin racing again in late 1985. In 1986, he competed in the newly created Suzuki GSXR National Cup Series. He was so successful at winning races that in only two years, he earned $260,000 in contingency fees while competing in the Suzuki sponsored series. He earned more money than any privateer rider in the history of American motorcycle racing. His success earned him a contract to race for the Yoshimura Suzuki racing team in 1988. With the Yoshimura team, he became the first competitor to win both the AMA 750cc Superbike and the 600cc Supersport titles.

In 1989 Polen had the opportunity to race for the Yoshimura team in Japan, winning the Formula 1 and Formula 3 in the All Japan Road Race Championship, the first time anyone had captured both titles the same season. While in Japan, Polen received a one-time offer to race in the Japanese round of the  Superbike World Championship and, made an impressive debut by winning the first race and finishing the second race in fourth place. Polen joined Eraldo Ferracci's "Fast By Ferracci" Ducati racing team to compete in the 1991 Superbike World Championship. He won the championship in a dominating fashion, winning 17 of 24 races in the series and finishing 150 points ahead of his nearest rival, the defending world champion Raymond Roche. Polen successfully defended his title by winning the 1992 Superbike World Championship. He also finished third overall in the 1992 AMA Superbike national championship.

In 1993, Polen left the world championship to compete exclusively in the United States and won the AMA Superbike national championship. In  he joined the UK-based Castrol Honda team to race the then-new RC45 in the Superbike World Championship, insisting that the team use Dunlop tyres due to his close ties with the company. He left the team abruptly in early  but not before teaming up with Aaron Slight to win the prestigious Suzuka 8 Hours endurance race for Honda. He teamed up with Peter Goddard to win the 1997 FIM Endurance World Championship before switching to a Honda to win the 1998 Endurance World Championship with Christian Lavieille.

Polen's total of 18 AMA pole positions was a record until Mat Mladin matched it in 2006. After retiring from racing, Polen formed a road racing school to help motorcyclists improve their skills. In 2011 Polen was inducted into the Motorcycle Hall of Fame.

Career statistics

Superbike World Championship

Races by year

Grand Prix motorcycle racing

Races by year
(key) (Races in bold indicate pole position, races in italics indicate fastest lap)

References

External links

 Doug Polen at the AMA Motorcycle Hall of Fame
 Doug Polen's Official Racing School
 Doug Polen's AMA Career profile

1960 births
Living people
Sportspeople from Detroit
Sportspeople from Denton, Texas
American motorcycle racers
AMA Superbike Championship riders
Superbike World Championship riders
500cc World Championship riders